Jeffrey Lynn Julian (born 9 October 1935) is a former New Zealand marathon runner.

Julian was born in Taumarunui, he trained under the legendary Arthur Lydiard and competed in the Marathon at the 1960 Summer Olympics in Rome, where he finished 18th and four years later at the 1964 Summer Olympics in Tokyo, finishing in 29th place, Julian was disappointed not to be selected for the 1968 Summer Olympics and made an unsuccessful selection bid for the 1972 Summer Olympics.

Julian also competed in three Commonwealth Games, starting with the 1962 British Empire and Commonwealth Games, where he finished 7th in the marathon and 10th in the 6 mile event, four years later at the 1966 British Empire and Commonwealth Games he finished 5th in the marathon and for his final appearance he finished 18th in the marathon in Edinburgh at the 1970 British Commonwealth Games.

In 1963 he won the Fukuoka Marathon. In 1969 he ran his personal best of 2:14:38 h at the Fukuoka Marathon, ranking eighth.

Fraud
After working for the Bank of New Zealand for 36 years he was made redundant, he then tried out some business ventures including selling live Aloe vera to farmers, but when the Government stop this process, it cost him a lot of money. In 2000 after six weeks on remand he was sentenced to two years in prison for conspiracy to defraud between 1996 and 1998, when Julian made 198 transaction involving $2,109,655, American Express stated there losses totalled $417,784 and Diners Club lost $9,115. Julian admitted he made the mistakes when funds due to him from overseas didn't arrive, he used his credit cards illegally.

References

External links 

 
 Profile at the ARRS
 Profile at trackfield.brinkster.net

1935 births
Living people
New Zealand male marathon runners
Olympic male marathon runners
Olympic athletes of New Zealand
Athletes (track and field) at the 1960 Summer Olympics
Athletes (track and field) at the 1964 Summer Olympics
Commonwealth Games competitors for New Zealand
Athletes (track and field) at the 1962 British Empire and Commonwealth Games
Athletes (track and field) at the 1966 British Empire and Commonwealth Games
Athletes (track and field) at the 1970 British Commonwealth Games
Japan Championships in Athletics winners
New Zealand Athletics Championships winners